Andreyevskoye is a rural locality (a village) in Chuchkovskoye Rural Settlement, Sokolsky District, Vologda Oblast, Russia. The population was 13 as of 2002.

Geography 
The distance to Sokol is 80 km, to Chuchkovo is 3 km. Mamonkino is the nearest rural locality.

References 

Rural localities in Sokolsky District, Vologda Oblast